Dominika Kluźniak (born July 10, 1980 in Wrocław, Poland) is a Polish theater, film and dubbing actress.

Biography 
Dominika Kluźniak was born July 10, 1980 in Wrocław, Poland. In 2003, she graduated from the Aleksander Zelwerowicz National Academy of Dramatic Art in Warsaw. Since then, she has been associated with the Dramatic Theater in Warsaw. In 2007, she played there in "Pippi Longstocking" (Pippi), for which she was awarded with the Warsaw Felix Award and the Award named after Aleksander Zelwerowicz for the 2007/2008 season. She awarded by the editors of the monthly "Teatr". Moreover, she was awarded with the Warsaw Felix Award for playing in "Obsługiwałem angielskiego króla" and "Sztuka bez tytułu". From the 2010/2011 season, she also plays on the stage of the National Theater in Warsaw.

Mother of two daughters.

References 

Aleksander Zelwerowicz National Academy of Dramatic Art in Warsaw alumni
Polish film actresses
Polish television actresses
Polish stage actresses
1980 births
Living people